Jennifer Baird,  is a British archaeologist and academic. She is Professor in Archaeology at Birkbeck, University of London. Her research focuses on the archaeology of Rome's eastern provinces, particularly the site of Dura-Europos.

Career 
Baird completed a PhD at the University of Leicester, graduating in 2006, with a thesis entitled: 'Housing and households at Dura-Europos: a study in identity on Rome's Eastern Frontier', supervised by Simon James. Baird was a Leverhulme Early Career Fellow at the University of Leicester. She joined Birkbeck in 2008. She is a Fellow of the Higher Education Academy. Baird co-directs the Roman Knossos Project, undertaking archaeological research in Crete. Baird has edited several volumes including Ancient Graffiti in Context (2011).

Baird has excavated at the site of Dura-Europos, work which lead to her 2014 and 2018 publications on the site.

Baird delivered the AIA Lecture on "From Aphlad to Zeus: The Archaeology of Diversity at Dura-Europos" at the University of British Columbia on 12 March 2019.

Honours and awards 
Baird was elected a Fellow of the Society of Antiquaries of London (FSA) in 2013.

Selected publications

Books 
Baird, J. A.  and C. Taylor, eds. 2010, Ancient Graffiti in Context. New York: Routledge.
Baird, J. A. 2014, The Inner Lives of Ancient Houses: An Archaeology of Dura-Europos. Oxford: Oxford University Press.
Baird, J. A. 2018, Dura-Europos. Bloomsbury Archaeological Histories Series. London: Bloomsbury.

Journal articles 
Baird, J. A. 2007, "Shopping, Eating and Drinking in Dura Europos: Reconstructing Context." in Luke Lavan, Ellen Swift, Toon Putzeys (ed.), Objects in Context, Objects in Use: Material Spatiality in Late Antiquity. Late Antique Archaeology, v. 5. Leiden/Boston:  Brill, 2007.  p.411-37.
Baird, J. A. 2012, "Re-excavating the Houses of Dura-Europos" Journal of Roman Archaeology 25: 146–169.
Baird, J. A. 2015, "On Reading the Material Culture of Ancient Sexual Labour" Helios 42.1: 163–175.
Baird, J. A. 2016, "Everyday Life in Roman Dura-Europos: The Evidence of Dress Practices" in Ted Kaizer (ed.), Religion, Society and Culture at Dura-Europos. Yale Classical Studies, 38. (Cambridge; New York)  p.30-56.
Baird, J.A. 2016, "Private Graffiti? Scratching the Walls of Houses at Dura-Europos" in Rebecca Benefiel, Peter Keegan (ed.), Inscriptions in the Private Sphere in the Greco-Roman World. Brill studies in Greek and Roman epigraphy, 7. Leiden; Boston:  Brill, 2016.  p.13-31.
Baird, J and Z Kamash, 2019, 'Remembering Roman Syria: Valuing Tadmor‐Palmyra, from ‘Discovery’ to Destruction' Bulletin of the Institute of Classical Studies 62.1, p.1-29.

References 

Academics of Birkbeck, University of London
Women classical scholars
Alumni of the University of Leicester
Fellows of the Society of Antiquaries of London
Year of birth missing (living people)
Living people